David Michael Nugent (born October 27, 1977) is a former professional American football defensive lineman for the New England Patriots and the Baltimore Ravens of the National Football League (NFL).

Early life and education
Nugent attended Houston High School and later Purdue University, where he played football as a defensive tackle.

Career
Nugent was drafted in the sixth round of the 2000 NFL draft by the New England Patriots. In his rookie season he played in six games. In his second season after playing a backup role at defensive end for seven games Nugent made his first career start for the Patriots against the Cleveland Browns on December 9, 2001. Nugent and the Patriots went on to win their first Super Bowl championship that season on February 3, 2002 in Super Bowl 36. Following his release from the Patriots due to an injury in training camp the Baltimore Ravens signed Nugent to their active roster on October 29, 2002. Nugent played in nine games with the Baltimore Ravens at defensive end. On September 5, 2003 the Ravens released Nugent following training camp. In February 2004 Nugent was allocated by the Oakland Raiders to the Rhein Fire of NFL Europe where after recording six sacks he earned 1st Team All NFL Europe honors.

References

External links
Purdue Boilermakers bio

1977 births
Living people
Players of American football from Cincinnati
American football defensive linemen
Purdue Boilermakers football players
New England Patriots players
Baltimore Ravens players